The European Journal of Neurology is a monthly peer-reviewed medical journal that covers all aspects of neurology. It was established in 1994 and is published by Wiley-Blackwell on behalf of the European Academy of Neurology. The editor-in-chief is Didier Leys (Université de Lille).

Abstracting and indexing
The journal is abstracted and indexed in:

According to the Journal Citation Reports, the journal has a 2020 impact factor of 6.089.

References

External links

Monthly journals
Wiley-Blackwell academic journals
Publications established in 1994
Neurology journals
English-language journals
Academic journals associated with international learned and professional societies of Europe